The 3rd European Rowing U23 Championships was the 3rd edition and was held from 7 to 8 September 2019 at the Ioannina Rowing Course in Ioannina, Greece.

Results

Men

Women

Medals

References

External links
Official website
WorldRowing website
Summary Results

2019
2019 in Greek sport
International sports competitions hosted by Greece
2019 in rowing
European Rowing U23